Sree Andalurkavu is a famous and prominent Thiyya Community Urayima temple in Andalur in Dharmadam village of Kannur district, North Kerala. This old temple is in the name of Lord Rama and the main festival is celebrated in mid-February: the first week of the month "Kumbam" of the Malayalam calendar. This Kavu also has a story of how the Kalaripayat warrior Thacholi Othenan, who once caused trouble in this Thiyar-dominated Kavu Andalur of Thalassery, was punished and defeated by the Thiyars and crossed the country through the bridge.

Annual festival

The annual festival is a wonderful visualisation of devotional unity of a place where people still follow very old and sacred customs throughout the season. It is the time the village gets themselves into a feeling in which they become part of and enjoy the happiness of being part of the glory of Lord Rama. It is the festival where it pictures the great culture merging the normal and common life with great old mythologies. The festival begins in February second week lasting seven days. More than ten theyyams are performed here during the festival. Among them the theyyam named  Daivathaar is the most important one. Devotees consider Daivathaar as a channel/medium of Lord Rama.

Worship
Being a part of North Malabar, in Andalur kavu Thira (also theyyam or theyaattam) is the main ritual of worship. It is one of the rare places where Yuddha kanda of Ramayana — the great epic — is visualised and performed. The main deities are Rama, Lakshmana and Hanuman. One significance for this kavu is that it has two holy places called Mele Kavu (upper temple) and Thazhe kavu (lower temple).

The Thazhe (pronounced as Thuley, but with the tongue touching the roof of the soft palate while saying the "l") Kavu is a sacred grove which harbors several rare plants species typical of the Myristica swamps, notably Syzygium travancoricum, an endangered endemic plant. Much of the flora of the sacred grove has been lost due to poor regeneration and the disturbance from cattle and human activity in this thickly populated area.

Etymology
The name Andalurkavu ("Andar-villoor-kavu") can be interpreted as the grove (sacred kavu) where the sacred weapons of deities are kept. There are interpretations that say this kavu was created by Sree Parasuraman, the sixth incarnation of Lord Vishnu. There are interesting interpretations behind names of all the other places that surround Andalur like Melur, Palayad and Dharmadam. The Andalur, especially the Andalurkavu is the most divine place for the people in all these areas.

Accessibility
Nearest Airports:
 Kannur International Airport - 
 Kozhikode International Airport - 
 Mangalore International Airport - 

Nearest Towns / Railway stations :
 Thalassery - 
 Kannur - 
 Mangalore -

Gallery

See also
 Andalur
 Palayad
 Dharmadam Island
 Temples of Kerala

References

External links
 Sree Andalurkavu
 A page from Anna Howard Shaw Center, Boston University - School of Theology
 Dharmadam

Hindu temples in Kannur district